Secret Story - Casa dos Segredos (occasionally be referred as Casa dos Segredos) was the Portuguese version of the reality show Secret Story, based on the original French version. The show inherits more or less the fundamental principles of Big Brother, a reality show created by producer John de Mol in 1997. The housemates are cut off from the outside world for ten to fifteen weeks in a house called "house of secrets", where every room is fitted with cameras, except the restroom. They have to keep a secret while trying to discover the other housemates' one.

Series details

Main seasons

Spin-off seasons

Presenters and programmes

Ratings

2012 - 2015

2016 - 2018

See also 
 Big Brother (Portugal)
 A Quinta

 
2010 Portuguese television series debuts